Furnace Creek Airport  is a public airport located 0.75 miles (1 km) west of Furnace Creek, Death Valley, serving Inyo County, California, USA. This general aviation airport covers 40 acres (16 ha) and has one runway. At −210 feet (−64 m) MSL, it is the lowest elevation airport in North America.

History
The original airfield, was built in 1929 by the Pacific Coast Borax Company. It served as an emergency landing field for Army and Navy military aircraft during WWII, and brought tourists into the newly declared National Monument.

The current airfield was opened in May 1954, one mile west of the previous landing strip along State Route 190, adjacent to Sunset Campground. The prior airfield is visible in aerial imagery, but is now used only as an overflow area for Sunset Campground during busy periods, such as the '49ers Encampment. For the first several years it was open, the airfield was plagued with problems with the pavement; the entirety of the 5,500 foot runway originally built quickly deteriorated and had to be repaired almost immediately after opening. The current runway is thinner and shorter, though the older pavement is still visible in satellite imagery.

See also

 California World War II Army Airfields
 List of places on land with elevations below sea level
 List of extreme points of the United States

References 

 www.airfieldsdatabase.com

External links 

Airports in Inyo County, California
Buildings and structures in Death Valley National Park
Airfields of the United States Army Air Forces in California
Flight Strips of the United States Army Air Forces
World War II airfields in the United States
1942 establishments in California
Airports established in 1945